Conny Rosén (born 24 March 1971) is a Swedish former footballer who played as a goalkeeper in the Allsvenskan for Helsingborgs IF.

References

External links
 

1971 births
Living people
Swedish footballers
Allsvenskan players
Högaborgs BK players
Helsingborgs IF players
Ängelholms FF players
Landskrona BoIS players
Association football goalkeepers